Baseball was contested at the 1938 Central American and Caribbean Games in Panama City, Panama.

References
 

1938 Central American and Caribbean Games
1938
1938
Central American and Caribbean Games